Psilocybe singularis is a species of psilocybin mushroom in the family Hymenogastraceae. Found in Oaxaca, Mexico, where it grows on bare clay soil in mesophytic forest, it was described as new to science in 2004.

See also
List of Psilocybe species
List of psilocybin mushrooms

References

External links

Entheogens
Fungi described in 2004
Psychoactive fungi
singularis
Psychedelic tryptamine carriers
Fungi of Mexico
Taxa named by Gastón Guzmán
Fungi without expected TNC conservation status